Çarıklar is a town in Mersin Province, Turkey.

Geography 
Çarıklar is a town within Anamur district of Mersin Province. Distance of the town center to Anamur is only . The borderline between the Anamur and Çarıklar is Dragon River at the west of Çarıklar. The population was 3072 as of 2009.

History 
The  hill Azıtepe and the ruins of the historical city of Alakise are within the town area. The present population of the town is known as Çaruklu, members of a Turkmen tribe. Before 1992, Çarıklar was a quarter of Anamur. But after a plebiscite, now Çarıklar is a separate town.

Economy 
The main economic sectors are greenhouse agriculture and dairying. Strawberries and peanuts are the most important products.

References

Towns in Turkey
Populated coastal places in Turkey
Populated places in Anamur District